White Lilacs in a Glass Vase (German - Der Fliederstrauß; French - Lilas blanc dans un vase de verre) is an 1882 painting by Édouard Manet, now in the Alte Nationalgalerie in Berlin. Showing cuttings of white lilacs in a glass vase, it is one of a series of flower still lifes by the painter.

References

1882 paintings
Paintings by Édouard Manet
Paintings in the collection of the Alte Nationalgalerie